Ayers, Illinois may refer to:
Ayers, Bond County, Illinois, an unincorporated community in Bond County, Illinois
Ayers, Carroll County, Illinois, an unincorporated community in Carroll County, Illinois